Miechów is a town in Lesser Poland Voivodeship, southern Poland.

Miechów may also refer to the following villages: 
Miechów, Lower Silesian Voivodeship (south-west Poland)
Miechów, Lubusz Voivodeship (west Poland)
Miechów, Masovian Voivodeship, (east-central Poland)

See also
 Miechowo
 Miechów-Kolonia